The 2007 edition of the men's basketball tournament of the African Games was the 9th, organized by FIBA Africa and played under the auspices of FIBA, the basketball sport governing body. The tournament was held from 12 to 22 July 2007 in Algiers, Algeria, contested by 11 national teams and won by Angola, who defeated Egypt 56–50 in the final to win their third title.

Squads

Draw

Preliminary round 

Times given below are in UTC+1.

Group A

Group B

Knockout stage

Championship bracket

Quarterfinals

Semifinals

Bronze medal match

Final

5–8th place bracket

5–8th place classification

7th place match

5th place match

9th place match

Final standings

Awards

All-Tournament Team
  Mayzer Alexandre
  Modibo Niakate
  Chamberlain Oguchi
  Ismail Ahmed
  Tarek El-Ghannam

Statistical Leaders

Individual Tournament Highs

Points per Game

Rebounds

Assists

2-point field goal percentage

3-point field goal percentage

Free throw percentage

Team Tournament Highs

Points per Game

Rebounds

Assists

2-point field goal percentage

3-point field goal percentage

Free throw percentage

See also
2007 FIBA Africa Championship

References

Basketball at the 2007 All-Africa Games